Rochus Wagner (born 28 July 1932) is a German former alpine skier who competed in the 1956 Winter Olympics.

References

1932 births
Living people
German male alpine skiers
Olympic alpine skiers of the United Team of Germany
Alpine skiers at the 1956 Winter Olympics